Ariën Pietersma (born 24 April 1987 in Dinteloord, North Brabant) is a Dutch football goalkeeper.

Career 
Pietersma's first encounter with professional football was in the 2006–07 season with NAC Breda. He was convicted of burglary in 2007, and was then loaned to RBC Roosendaal for the following season.

Pietersma was signed by Willem II in July 2008, as they were searching for a third goalkeeper. In 2009 he was once again loaned out to RBC, and then in 2010 he played for Dijkse Boys until the club withdrew from the Topklasse for financial reasons. In his last game against SC Genemuiden Pietersma was shown the red card for a scandalous foul of 'ernstig gemeen spel' (seriously mean play), which earned him a seven game suspension as the KNVB stated.

References

External links 
Profile at Voetbal International

1987 births
Living people
People from Steenbergen
Dutch footballers
NAC Breda players
Willem II (football club) players
RBC Roosendaal players
Eerste Divisie players
Association football goalkeepers
Footballers from North Brabant